"Bande organisée" is a song by Jul featuring SCH, Kofs, Naps, Soso Maness, Elams, Solda and Houari. It was released on 15 August 2020, as the lead single off the collective studio album 13 Organisé. The song spent twelve consecutive weeks atop the French Singles Chart and was certified Diamond in France within five weeks.

Charts

Weekly charts

Year-end charts

Certifications

References

2020 singles
2020 songs
French-language songs
Number-one singles in France